Shoefitr Inc. was a privately held multinational corporation that created software to help internet shoe shoppers find proper fitting footwear. Shoefitr was acquired by Amazon.com in 2015. Amazon uses Shoefitr's 3D scanning technology to acquire measurements of the inside of shoes and compare them. In 2011 Shoefitr was voted most likely to be acquired at LAUNCH Conference. It was also voted the "Startup blastoff winner" at the inaugural SuperConf.

References

External links
 Shoefitr Homepage
 Time Magazine - Shoefitr: Perfect Fit for Online Shoe Shopping?
 CNET - Shoefitr uses 3D to help buy the right kicks

Amazon (company) acquisitions
Multinational companies